List of the published work of Luke Davies, Australian writer.

Novels

 Candy: A Novel of Love and Addiction (Ballantine Books, New York 1998) 
 Isabelle the Navigator (Allen & Unwin Publishers, Sydney 2000)
 Isabelle the Navigator (Berkley Books, New York 2002) 
 God of Speed (Allen and Unwin, 2008), about Howard Hughes

Children's books
Magpie (HarperCollins Publishers Australia, Sydney 2010)

Screenplays
Candy (co-written with Neil Armfield; 2006)
Air (short film; also directed; 2009)
Reclaim (co-written with Carmine Gaeta; 2014)
Life (2015)
Lion (2016)
Beautiful Boy (co-written with Felix Van Groeningen; 2018)
Catch-22 (miniseries; 2019)
Angel of Mine (co-written with David Regal; 2019)
News of the World (co-written with Paul Greengrass; 2020)

Poetry
 Four plots for magnets (Glandular Press, 1982) 
 Absolute event horizon : poems (Angus & Robertson, 1994) 
 Running with light : poems (Allen & Unwin, 1999) 
 Totem : Totem poem plus 40 love poems (Allen & Unwin, 2004)  Review
 Interferon psalms: 33 psalms on the 99 names of God (Allen & Unwin, 2011) 
 Four plots for magnets (Pitt Street Poetry reissue with additional material, 2013)

Articles

 Film review of Milk, directed by Gus Van Sant.
 Film review of Tomas Alfredson's Let the right one in.
 Reviews Rolf de Heer's Charlie's Country and Iain Forsyth and Jane Pollard's 20,000 Days on Earth.

References

Bibliographies by writer
Bibliographies of Australian writers